Geoffrey Llewellyn Nicholls (22 September 1919 – 24 September 1997) was an Australian rules footballer who played with Collingwood and Fitzroy in the Victorian Football League (VFL).

Nicholls also served in the Australian Army during World War II.

Notes

External links 

Profile on Collingwood Forever

1919 births
1997 deaths
Australian rules footballers from Melbourne
Collingwood Football Club players
Fitzroy Football Club players
People from Fitzroy, Victoria
Australian Army personnel of World War II
Military personnel from Melbourne